The rock-loving mouse (Mus saxicola), also known as the brown spiny mouse, is a species of rodent in the family Muridae.
It is found in India, Nepal, and Pakistan.

References

Mus (rodent)
Rodents of Pakistan
Rodents of India
Mammals of Nepal
Mammals described in 1839
Taxonomy articles created by Polbot